The United States Uncirculated Coin Set, known as the Uncirculated Set or Mint Set in the United States, is an annual coin set sold by the United States Mint.  The set is marketed towards coin collectors as a way to obtain circulation coins in mint condition.

"Double" Mint Sets (1947–1958) 
The Uncirculated Mint Set was introduced in 1947, containing two examples of each coin issued for circulation packaged in a cardboard display case.  The reason for this was so that collectors could display both the obverse and reverse of each coin in the set's packaging, which allowed only one side of the coin to be displayed.

Because of the sulfur content in the cardboard packaging, many coins included in the sets developed toning.

1959–1964 Mint Sets 
In 1959, the packaging of the Mint Set was changed to cellophane pouches.  This change allowed both sides of the coins to be displayed, and eliminated the need to include two examples of each coin.  This led to a significant drop in price and an increase in popularity.

Special Mint Sets (1964–1967) 
Due to a shortage of coins blamed on coin collectors, the United States Department of the Treasury introduced the Coinage Act of 1965, which mandated that mint marks would be removed from all coinage for five years.  The USDT also announced that no proof or uncirculated coin sets would be produced from 1965 through 1967.  Instead, a "Special Mint Set" was made available, containing one example of each denomination produced at the San Francisco Mint.  These coins were struck with a satin-like finish, and unlike the coins found in standard Mint Sets, are considered to be separate issues from the circulation coins.

Due to the fact that no proof sets were produced from 1965 to 1967, many proof set collectors obtain Special Mint Sets to complete their collections of "yearly proof set" collections.

Several dozen 1964 Special Mint Sets were produced for unknown reasons.  The existence of these sets remained largely unknown until the 1990s, when one of the sets was sold at an auction.  The coins featured the same satin finish as the other Special Mint Sets.

1968–2004 Mint Sets 
1968 saw the return of mintmarks on United States coinage and the standard Mint Set.  Apart from minor changes to the packaging, the new mint sets were nearly identical to the previous Mint Sets.  The dollar coin made its Mint Set debut in 1973, and was notably not issued for circulation that year.

No Mint Sets were produced in 1982 and 1983, and when the set returned in 1984, no dollar coin was included (the denomination had been discontinued in 1981) and US Mint tokens from the Philadelphia and Denver Mints were included in its place.  These tokens were removed from the set when the denomination was reintroduced in 2000.

A dime featuring the W mint mark (West Point Mint) was included in the 1996 Mint Set to commemorate the 50th anniversary of the Roosevelt dime.  The coin was not issued for circulation.

Satin-finish Mint Sets (2005–2010) 

In 2005, the US Mint started to produce Mint Set coins using special sandblasted dies, giving the coins a distinctive satin finish similar to the Special Mint Set coins.  Like the Special Mint Set coins, many numismatists consider these to be separate issues from the circulation coins.

With a total of 36 coins and a total face value of $14.38, the 2009 Mint Set had the most coins and highest face value of any Mint Set to date.

Brilliant-Finish Mint Sets (2011–Present) 

In 2011, the US Mint changed the finish of Mint Set coins to a more proof-like "brilliant" finish.  This change was made because the satin finish of the 2005–2010 coins made contact marks more apparent.  The brilliant finish coins are struck with more force than circulation coins, resulting in higher quality and more detailed design.  However, like the pre-2005 Mint Sets, these coins are not considered different issues.

A penny with the W mint mark was included in the 2019 Mint Set to commemorate the 110th anniversary of the Lincoln cent.  Similarly, a W mint mark nickel was planned to be included in the 2020 Mint Set; however due to the COVID pandemic, the coin was not produced.

Bicentennial Silver Mint Set (1976) 

In 1976, the US Mint issued a mint set containing a quarter, half dollar, and dollar coin minted in silver.  These coins featured special reverse designs commemorating the bicentennial of American independence.

Souvenir Sets

Standard set 
Starting in 1972, the Denver Mint started selling Souvenir Sets, and the Philadelphia Mint did the same in 1973.  These sets, available in each mints' gift shop following a public tour, contained one example of that mints' penny, nickel, dime, quarter, and half dollar, along with a medal featuring an image of its mint.  These sets were sold until they were discontinued with the launch of the 50 State Quarter Program in 1999.  Production figures were not recorded by the mint, and the sets receive relatively little attention from coin collectors.  The 1982 and 1983 sets are an exception, though, as no Mint Sets were sold for those years, so these were collected instead.

Susan B. Anthony dollar sets 
Souvenir Sets containing Susan B. Anthony dollars from the Philadelphia, Denver, and San Francisco Mints were offered from 1979 through 1981.

References 

Coins of the United States